The New Oscar Pettiford Sextet is an album by bassist/cellist and composer Oscar Pettiford which was recorded in late 1953 and first issued on the Debut label as a 10-inch LP. The material on the original album was rereleased on Fantasy in 1964 with additional material as My Little Cello.

Reception

The Allmusic review by Rick Anderson states: "most noteworthy of all is the quality of his compositions. 'Pendulum at Falcon's Lair' is a piece of world-class bebop writing, while 'Tamalpais Love Song' is almost classical in its structure, achieving a counterintuitive combination of complexity and simple beauty". In JazzTimes, Duck Baker wrote: "This 1953 date is a highly-arranged, lightly-swinging affair that features nice soloing".

Track listing 
All compositions by Oscar Pettiford, except where noted.
 "The Pendulum at Falcon's Lair" - 4:44
 "Tamalpais Love Song" - 3:52
 "Jack, the Fieldstalker" - 4:34
 "Stockholm Sweetnin'" (Quincy Jones) - 4:14
 "Low and Behold" - 3:27

Personnel 
Oscar Pettiford - cello (tracks 1 & 3-5), bass (track 2)
Julius Watkins - French horn 
Phil Urso - tenor saxophone
Walter Bishop, Jr. - piano
Charles Mingus - bass  (tracks 1 & 3-5) 
Percy Brice - drums

References 

Oscar Pettiford albums
1953 albums
Debut Records albums